Thelignya is a genus of fungi within the family Lichinaceae. It is monotypic, containing only the single species Thelignya fuliginea.

References

External links 

 Thelignya at Index Fungorum

Lichinomycetes
Lichen genera
Taxa described in 1855
Taxa named by Abramo Bartolommeo Massalongo